Zeppelin LZ 55 (Army tactical number LZ 85) was a P-class Zeppelin of the Imperial German Army in World War I. It was shot down by the old British pre-dreadnough battleship HMS Agamemnon in 1916 during Salonika campaign

History

On 5 May 1916 LZ55 made another attack on Thessaloniki (Salonika) harbour. Part way through the attack it was caught in spotlights. and all the ships in the area opened fire with their anti-aircraft guns. LZ55 continued its attack but  12-pounder anti-aircraft gun hit LZ 55; breaking it in half according to one of the crew. The crash site soon became a tourist attraction, with a report that "a dozen Canadian nurses. They had come up ... and waded through to it. What a sight they did look, skirts up round their waists wading through mud and slime up to their knees." 

The metal structure of the Zeppelin was dragged by Allied soldiers from the swamps to the White Tower of Thessaloniki. There it was reconstructed so that Allied engineers could study how the Germans built airships.

Specifications (LZ55 / P-class zeppelin)

See also

List of Zeppelins

References

Bibliography
 
 
 
 

Accidents and incidents involving balloons and airships
Accidents and incidents involving military aircraft
Airships of the Imperial German Navy 
1910s German bomber aircraft
Hydrogen airships
Zeppelins
Airships of Germany
Airships